Montclair High School may refer to:
 Montclair High School (California) in Montclair, California
 Montclair High School (New Jersey) in Montclair, New Jersey